Nadja Sofie Bender Knudsen (born June 3, 1990), known professionally as Nadja Bender is a Danish fashion model.

Early life 

Before modeling, she studied nanotechnology at the University of Copenhagen.

Career 
Bender was discovered when a neighbor contacted a modeling agent on her behalf. She started her career with New York Model Management. She debuted in September 2011, during NYFW, walking down the runway for Alexander Wang and Rodarte. During the next year she also modeled for brands like Yves Saint Laurent, Calvin Klein, Chanel, Diane von Furstenberg, Proenza Schouler, Burberry, Versace, Gucci, Fendi, Balenciaga, Tom Ford, Dolce & Gabbana, and Christian Dior among many others.

Her first modeling campaign was done for Gucci. She has also done campaigns for H&M, Chanel, Fendi and Mango.

References 

1990 births
Living people
Danish female models
University of Copenhagen alumni
People from Copenhagen